The 2016–17 Honduran Liga Nacional season was the 51st Honduran Liga Nacional edition since its establishment in 1965.  For this season, the system format stayed the same as the previous season.  The tournament began in July 2016 and ended in May 2017.

2016–17 teams

A total of 10 teams competed in the tournament, including 9 sides from the 2015–16 season plus C.D. Social Sol, promoted from the 2015–16 Liga de Ascenso.

Managerial changes

Apertura
The Apertura tournament is the first half of the 2016–17 season which was played from 29 July to 18 December 2016.  The fixture was unveiled on 9 July.  C.D. Social Sol made its official debut in Liga Nacional on 29 July when they lost 3–2 to Club Deportivo Olimpia at Estadio Tiburcio Carías Andino.  C.D. Real Sociedad's Marvin Solano became the first manager to get sacked after only four weeks the season started.  On week 10, C.D. Motagua and C.D. Honduras Progreso draw 0–0 in Catacamas; in such game, Melissa Borjas became the first female referee in Liga Nacional's history to enforce the laws in an official game.  Motagua obtained its 14th national league after defeating Platense F.C. in an unprecedented final series.

Regular season

Standings

Results
 As of 19 November 2016

Postseason

Results

 Real España won 5–3 on aggregated.

 Motagua 3–3 Marathón on aggregated; Motagua advanced on regular season performance.

 Motagua won 2–1 on aggregated.

 Platense 2–2 Real España on aggregated; Platense advanced on regular season performance.

 Motagua won 2–1 on aggregated.

Clausura
The Clausura tournament is the second half of the 2016–17 season.  The regular season fixtures were released on 10 December 2016.  The first match of the tournament was played on 7 January at Estadio Francisco Morazán between  Real C.D. España and C.D. Social Sol which ended in a scoreless tie.  On 8 February, Club Deportivo Olimpia defeated C.D.S. Vida with a 7–1 score, a game in which striker Roger Rojas scored five goals, a record only shared with Arturo Garden, Jorge Arriola and Marlon Hernández.  On week 7, Vida and Juticalpa F.C. draw 1–1 at Estadio Carlos Calderón, a venue used in Liga Nacional for the first time.  On 22 April, Social Sol's player Francisco Reyes became the first ever goalkeeper to score two goals in a league match after converting two penalty kicks in the 2–1 victory over C.D. Marathón.  On 28 May, C.D. Motagua obtained its 15th league title and their second in a row after defeating C.D. Honduras Progreso with a 7–1 aggregated score.  In such game, 4 people were kill due to suffocation after a human stampede tried to push their way in to access the stadium which was already overcrowded.

Regular season

Standings

Results
 As of 29 April 2017

Postseason

Results

 Real España won 5–3 on aggregated.

 Honduras Progreso 1–1 Marathón on aggregated; Honduras Progreso advanced on regular season performance.

 Honduras Progreso won 6–4 on aggregated.

 Motagua won 4–3 on aggregated.

 Motagua won 7–1 on aggregated.

Top goalscorers
 As of 28 May 2017

 22 goals:

  Rony Martínez (Real Sociedad)

 20 goals:

  Carlos Lanza (Juticalpa)

 19 goals:

  Carlo Costly (Olimpia)

 18 goals:

  Román Castillo (Motagua)

 16 goals:

  Ángel Tejeda (H. Progreso / Real España)

 15 goals:

  Erick Andino (Motagua)

 13 goals:

  Domingo Zalazar (Real España)
  Javier Estupiñán (Olimpia)

 12 goals:

  Claudio Cardozo (Real España)

 11 goals:

  Brunet Hay (Platense)
  Carlos Discua (Motagua)

 10 goals:

  Roby Norales (Platense)
  Juan Rodríguez (Marathón)

 9 goals:

  Pablo Arzú (Real Sociedad)
  Michaell Chirinos (Olimpia)
  Alexander López (Olimpia)
  Bryan Acosta (Real España)

 8 goals:

  Charles Córdoba (Marathón / Juticalpa)
  Iván López (Real España)
  Marco Vega (Motagua)

 7 goals:

  Romell Quioto (Olimpia)
  Luis Lobo (Platense)
  Walter Martínez (Marathón)
  Wilmer Crisanto (Motagua)
  Roger Rojas (Olimpia)
  Jerrel Britto (Honduras Progreso)

 6 goals:

  Diego Reyes (Marathón)
  Carlos Sánchez (Honduras Progreso)
  Justin Arboleda (Marathón)

 5 goals:

  Bryan Róchez (Real España)
  Henry Martínez (Real Sociedad)
  Marlon Ramírez (Vida)
  Pedro Mencía (Honduras Progreso)
  Néstor Martínez (Platense / Social Sol)
  Juan Ocampo (Juticalpa)
  Edder Delgado (Real España)
  César Guillén (Vida)
  Frédixon Elvir (Honduras Progreso)
  Jorge A. Cardona (Honduras Progreso)

 4 goals:

  Juan Montes (Motagua)
  Óscar Salas (Olimpia)
  Félix Crisanto (Motagua)
  Alexander Aguilar (Juticalpa)
  Santiago Vergara (Motagua)
  Roy Smith (Honduras Progreso)

 3 goals:

  Esdras Padilla (Juticalpa)
  Carlos Ramírez (Social Sol)
  Víctor Moncada (H. Progreso / Real España)
  Jerry Palacios (Vida)
  Osman Melgares (Real Sociedad)
  Francisco Reyes (Social Sol)
  Ever Alvarado (Olimpia)
  Rony Flores (Juticalpa)
  Jeancarlos Vargas (Platense)
  Cholby Martínez (Vida)
  Luciano Ursino (Real España)
  Júnior Martínez (Real Sociedad)
  Joshua Vargas (Marathón)
  Reinieri Mayorquín (Motagua)
  Édgar Álvarez (Platense)
  Bayron Méndez (Olimpia)
  Richard Dixon (Platense)
  Maximiliano Osurak (Platense)
  José Arévalo (Real España)
  Roberto Riascos (Social Sol)

 2 goals:

  Aldo Oviedo (Juticalpa)
  Cristopher Urmeneta (Social Sol)
  Carlos Mejía (Olimpia)
  Brayan Velásquez (Vida)
  Horacio Parham (Juticalpa)
  Jonathan Paz (Real Sociedad)
  Samuel Córdova (Marathón)
  Edgar Martínez (Social Sol)
  Dabirson Castillo (Platense)
  Marcelo Pereira (Motagua)
  Franklyn Morales (Honduras Progreso)
  Kenrick Cárcamo (Real Sociedad)
  John Suazo (Marathón)
  Nixon Duarte (Honduras Progreso)
  Jorge J. Cardona (Platense)
  Hilder Colón (Real Sociedad / Juticalpa)
  Walter García (Olimpia)
  César Oseguera (Real España)
  Raúl Santos (Vida)
  Irvin Reyna (Motagua)
  Omar Elvir (Motagua)
  Israel Silva (Marathón)
  Sergio Peña (Real Sociedad)
  Jorge Bengoché (Olimpia)
  Frelys López (Honduras Progreso)
  Carlos Bernárdez (Vida)
  Getsel Montes (Platense)
  Luis López (Platense)
  Pastor Martínez (Honduras Progreso)
  Mario Martínez (Social Sol)
  Kevin López (Motagua)

 1 goal:

  Leonardo Isaula (Honduras Progreso)
  Osman Chávez (Real España)
  Gerson Díaz (Social Sol)
  José Fonseca (Olimpia)
  Kevin Álvarez (Olimpia)
  Henrry Clark (Real Sociedad)
  Cristopher Anariba (Honduras Progreso)
  Nissi Sauceda (Vida)
  Elvin Casildo (Olimpia)
  Mario Berríos (Marathón)
  Jairo Puerto (Marathón)
  Darvis Argueta (Marathón)
  Efraín López (Social Sol)
  Cristhian Altamirano (Real España)
  Richard Rodríguez (Vida)
  Emiliano Forgione (Platense)
  José Hernández (Juticalpa)
  Carlos Solórzano (Real Sociedad)
  Germy García (Honduras Progreso)
  Juan Mejía (Juticalpa)
  Douglas Martínez (Vida)
  Bryan Johnson (Olimpia)
  Leonardo Benedit (Social Sol)
  Darwin Bermúdez (Honduras Progreso)
  José García (Juticalpa)
  Micher Antúnez (Social Sol)
  Brayan Barrios (Marathón)
  Mario Flores (Platense)
  Óscar Medina (Platense)
  Ian Osorio (Real Sociedad)
  Gerson Rodas (Olimpia)
  Víctor Berríos (Marathón)
  Jhow Benavídez (Real España)
  Davis Argueta (Marathón)
  Héctor Castellanos (Motagua)
  Shannon Welcome (Juticalpa)
  José Canelas (Social Sol)
  Wilfredo Barahona (Real España)
  Romario Cavachuela (Social Sol)
  Maylor Núñez (Platense)
  Omar Salazar (Real España)
  Hárlington Gutiérrez (Real Sociedad)
  Allans Vargas (Real España)
  Ángel Oseguera (Juticalpa)
  Mario Ventura (Social Sol)
  Elkin González (Real Sociedad)
  Luis Alvarado (Honduras Progreso)
  César García (Social Sol)
  Elder Torres (Vida)
  Henry Romero (Marathón)
  Johny Rivera (Honduras Progreso)
  Joshua Nieto (Platense)
  Emere Robles (Social Sol)
  Ángel Barboza (Marathón)
  Juan Delgado (Honduras Progreso)
  Fabián Arriaga (Platense)

 1 own goal:

  Dilmer Gutiérrez (Honduras Progreso)
  Júnior Izaguirre (Motagua)
  Yul Arzú (Real Sociedad)

 2 own goals:

  Bryan Johnson (Olimpia / Vida)

Aggregate table
Relegation is determined by the aggregated table of both Apertura and Clausura tournaments.  The relegation was decided in the very last round as C.D. Social Sol draw 2–2 against C.D. Motagua and fall short two points behind C.D.S. Vida.

Awards
The 2016–17 season awards were published on 17 November 2017 as follows:
 Best reserves coach: Francisco Pavón (C.D.S. Vida)
 Reserves MVP: Carlos Mejía (C.D.S. Vida)
 Reserves goalscorer: Darwin Arita (Platense F.C.)
 Rookie of the year: Jeancarlo Vargas (Platense F.C.)
 Top goalscorer: Rony Martínez (C.D. Real Sociedad)
 MVP: Carlos Discua (C.D. Motagua)
 Goalkeeper of the year: John Bodden (C.D. Marathón)
 Coach of the year: Diego Vásquez (C.D. Motagua)
 Referee of the year: Melvin Matamoros

References

External links
 LNP Official

Liga Nacional de Fútbol Profesional de Honduras seasons
Liga Nacional
Honduras